is a railway station in the town of Tateyama, Nakaniikawa District, Toyama Prefecture, Japan, operated by the private railway operator Toyama Chihō Railway.

Lines
It is also the starting point for the Tateyama Kurobe Kankō Tateyama Cable Car (Tateyama Kurobe Alpine Route).

Station layout 
The station has one ground-level bay platform serving two tracks. The station is staffed.

History
Tateyama Station was opened on 1 August 1954. Services of the Tateyama Cable Car were relocated to this station on 1 April 1970. The station building was renovated in 1982.

Adjacent stations

Passenger statistics
In fiscal 2015, the station was used by 591 passengers daily.

Surrounding area 
Tateyama Ski area
Tateyama Caldera Sabo Museum

See also
 List of railway stations in Japan

References

External links

  (Toyama Chihō Railway)
  (Tateyama Cable Car)

Railway stations in Toyama Prefecture
Railway stations in Japan opened in 1954
Stations of Toyama Chihō Railway